Shrimp goby or prawn goby may refer to any of several genera of fishes  in the subfamily Gobiinae, including:

 Amblyeleotris
 Cryptocentrus